This list of lakes in the San Francisco Bay Area groups lakes, ponds, and reservoirs by county. Numbers in parentheses are Geographic Names Information System feature ids.

Alameda County

 Almond Reservoir
 Berryman Reservoir
 Bethany Reservoir
 Calaveras Reservoir - partly in Santa Clara County.
 Central Reservoir
 Lake Chabot
 Cull Canyon Lake
 Lake Del Valle
 Dingee Reservoir
 Don Castro Reservoir
 Lake Elizabeth
 Frick Lake
 Frog Pond
 Heron Pond
 Jordan Pond
 The Lagoon
 Lake Merritt
 Middlefield Reservoir
 Mission Reservoir
 Newt Pond
 Niles Reservoir
 Patterson Reservoir
 Reservoir Number One
 Reservoir Number Two
 San Antonio Reservoir
 Seneca Reservoir
 South Reservoir
 Swimming Lagoon
 Lake Temescal
 Thirtyninth Avenue Reservoir
 Tule Pond
 Tyson Lake
 Upper San Leandro Reservoir - partly in Contra Costa County.
 Whitfield Reservoir

Contra Costa County

 Lake Alhambra
 Antioch Municipal Reservoir
 Lake Anza
 Black Hills Reservoir
 Brickyard Cove Pond
 Briones Reservoir
 Brookwood Reservoir
 Lake Cascade
 Chase Pond
 Clifton Court Forebay
 Contra Loma Reservoir
 Lake El Toyonal
 Fay Hill Reservoir
 Frog Pond
 Hidden Pond
 Hilltop Lake
 Jewel Lake
 Lafayette Reservoir
 Leland Reservoir
 Los Vaqueros Reservoir
 Mallard Reservoir
 Maloney Reservoir
 Marsh Creek Reservoir
 Martinez Reservoir
 Miller/Knox Lagoon
 Moraga Reservoir
 North Reservoir
 Point Potrero Pond
 San Pablo Reservoir
 Selby Reservoir
 Sindicich Lagoons
 Sobrante Reservoir
 Summit Reservoir
 Upper San Leandro Reservoir - partly in Alameda County.
 Willow Lake

Marin County

 Abbotts Lagoon
 Alpine Lake
 Arroyo Sausal Reservoir
 Bass Lake
 Belvedere Lagoon
 Big Lagoon
 Bon Tempe Lake
 Civic Center Lagoon
 Crystal Lake
 Forbes Hill Reservoir
 Hagmaier Pond North
 Hagmaier Pond South
 Haypress Pond
 Kent Lake
 Laguna Lake - partly in Sonoma County.
 Lake Lagunitas
 Lily Lake
 Mill Pond
 Mill Valley Reservoir
 Mud Lake
 Nicasio Reservoir
 Ocean Lake
 Pelican Lake
 Phoenix Lake
 Rodeo Lagoon
 Scottsdale Pond
 Soulajule Reservoir
 Stafford Lake
 Tamarancho Lake
 Wildcat Lake

Napa County
 Alfalfa Patch Reservoir
 Bell Canyon Reservoir
 Lake Berryessa
 Lake Camille
 Cooksley Lake
 Lake Curry
 Crystal Lake
 Deer Lake
 Doe Lake
 Duvall Lake
 East Napa Reservoir
 East Side Reservoir
 Lake Ellen
 Fawn Lake
 Fiege Reservoir
 Granite Lake
 Lake Henne
 Lake Hennessey
 Lake Hinman
 Horse Pond
 Leoma Lakes
 Lake Madigan - partly in Solano County.
 Lake Marie
 Milliken Reservoir
 Moskowitz Reservoir
 Mud Lake
 Lake Newton
 Lake Orville
 Rector Reservoir
 Red Lake
 Weeks Lake
 Lake Whitehead
 Wild Lake
 West Napa Reservoir

San Francisco

 Elk Glen Lake
 Laguna Honda Reservoir
 Lily Pond
 Lloyd Lake
 Lombard Street Reservoir
 Mallard Lake
 McNab Lake
 Lake Merced
 Metson Lake
 Middle Lake
 Mountain Lake
 North Basin
 North Lake
 Pine Lake
 South Basin
 South Lake
 Spreckels Lake
 Stow Lake
 Sunset Reservoir
 Sutro Reservoir
 Twin Peaks Reservoir

San Mateo County

 Bean Hollow Lake
 Bear Gulch Reservoir
 Big Lagoon
 Central Lake
 Reservoir de los Frijoles
 Knuedler Lake
 Laguna Salada
 Little Lagoon
 Lower Crystal Springs Reservoir
 Lower Emerald Lake
 Lake Lucerne
 Mindego Lake
 Pearsons Pond
 Pilarcitos Lake
 Pomponio Reservoir
 Reflection Lake
 San Andreas Lake
 Schilling Lake
 Searsville Lake
 Spencer Lake
 Stone Dam Reservoir
 Upper Crystal Springs Reservoir
 Upper Emerald Lake
 Water Dog Lake

Santa Clara County

 Almaden Reservoir
 Anderson Lake
 Borondo Lake
 Bulhead Reservoir
 Calaveras Reservoir - partly in Alameda County.
 Calero Reservoir
 Cherry Flat Reservoir
 Chesbro Reservoir
 Lake Couzzens
 Coyote Lake
 Lake Cunningham
 Lake Elsman
 Felt Lake
 Guadalupe Reservoir
 Halls Valley Lake
 Hoover Lake
 Howell Reservoir
 Lagunita
 Laguna Seca
 Lexington Reservoir
 Lone Lake
 Los Alamitos Percolation Ponds
 Lake McKenzie
 Mud Lake
 Oak Springs Reservoir
 Pacheco Reservoir
 Lake Ranch Reservoir
 Sandy Wool Lake
 Shaeirn Lake
 Shoreline Lake
 Sprig Lake
 Stevens Creek Reservoir
 Tisdale Reservoir
 Tule Lake
 Uvas Reservoir
 Vasona Reservoir
 Williams Reservoir

Solano County
 Lake Chabot
 Lake Dalwigk
 Lake Frey
 Lake Herman
 Little Medora Lake
 Lake Madigan - partly in Napa County.
 Medora Lake
 Pine Lake
 Puddy Lake
 Suisun Reservoir
 Summit Reservoir
 Swanzy Reservoir
 Terminal Reservoir

Sonoma County

 Brush Creek Reservoir
 Dugans Pond
 Fern Lake
 Fountaingrove Lake
 Frog Lake
 Goose Lake
 Gravelly Lake
 Hedgpeth Lake
 Jenner Pond
 Lake Idell
 Lake Ilsanjo
 Lake Josephine
 Laguna Lake - partly in Marin County.
 Lee Lake
 Lake Lower
 Lytton Lake
 Merlo Lake
 Moonshine Pond
 Lake Oliver
 Onion Pond
 Lake Orth
 Petaluma Reservoir
 Pine Creek Reservoir
 Preston Lake
 Lake Ralphine
 Matanzas Creek Reservoir
 Redwood Lake
 Roberts Lake
 Santa Rosa Creek Reservoir
 Lake Sonoma
 Lake Suttonfield
 Tolay Lake
 Toole Pond
 Vineyard Lake

See also

 Hydrography of the San Francisco Bay Area
 List of lakes in California
 List of reservoirs and dams in California
 List of watercourses in the San Francisco Bay Area

References
 

 
San Francisco Bay Area
Lakes
 
Lakes
Water in California